Wangliang ( or ) is the name of a malevolent spirit in Chinese mythology and folklore. This word inclusively means "demons; monsters; specters; goblins; ghosts; devils" in Modern Standard Chinese, but wangliang originally meant a specific demon. Interpretations include a wilderness spirit like the kui  "one-legged mountain demon", a water spirit like the long  "dragon", a fever demon like the yu  "poisonous 3-legged turtle that causes malaria", a graveyard ghost also called wangxiang  or fangliang  "earth demon that eats the livers or brains of corpses", and a man-eating "demon that resembles a 3-year-old brown child with red eyes, long ears, and beautiful hair".

Name
In modern Chinese usage, wangliang "demon; monster" is usually written  with radical-phonetic characters, combining the "ghost radical"  (typically used to write words concerning ghosts, demons, etc.) with phonetic elements wang  and liang  (lit. "deceive" and "two", respectively). In Warring States period (475–221 BC) usage, wangliang was also phonetically transcribed using the character pronunciations wang  and liang , and written  with the "animal radical"  (used to write names of insects, dragons, etc.) or wangliang  using liang  "dry moat" with the "gate radical"  (typically used to write architectural terminology).

While liang  only occurs as a bound morpheme in wangliang, wang occurs in other expressions such as wangmei  "evil spirits". Wǎngliǎng "demons and monsters" frequently occurs in the synonym-compound chīmèiwǎngliǎng  "demons; monsters". Since commentators differentiate between chimei "demons of the mountains and forests" and wangliang "demons of the rivers and marshes", chimeiwangliang can mean either "demons; monsters; evil spirits" generally or "mountain demons and water demons" separately. For example, James Legge's Zuozhuan translation syllabically splits chimeiwangliang into four types of demons, "the injurious things, and the hill-sprites, monstrous things, and water-sprites".

Chinese scholars have identified wangxiang  and fangliang  as probable synonyms of wangliang < Old Chinese *maŋʔp.raŋʔ  (citing Baxter and Sagart's (2014) reconstructions). Wangxiang < *maŋʔs.[d]aŋʔ  means "water demon" and the reverse xiangwang < *s.[d]aŋʔmaŋʔ  means "a water ghost" in the Zhuangzi (which uses wangliang < *maŋʔp.raŋʔ  for the allegorical character Penumbra, see below). The Guoyu distinguishes wangliang  "a tree and rock demon" and wangxiang  "a water demon" (see below). Fangliang < *paŋ[r]aŋ  names a "graveyard demon", identified as the wangliang < *maŋʔp.raŋʔ , that is exorcized in the Zhouli (below).

A simple explanation for these phonological data and revolving identifications of demon names is that they were dialectic variations or corruptions of each other. William G. Boltz gives a more sophisticated interpretation that these were not just a confusion between various similar, but independent, names, but actually all variants of one and the same underlying designation: an initial consonantal cluster **BLjang ~ **BZjang "see". Citing Bernhard Karlgren's reconstructions of Old Chinese, Boltz gives *mjwang-ljang  < **BLjang, *pjwang-ljang  < **BLjang, and *mjwang-dzjang  < **BZjang. Furthermore, if these names derived from a common protoform **BLjang or **BZjang "see", that implies that the spirits were not so much "demons" as "specters" (from Latin spectrum "appearance; apparition") or "visions".

Another proposed etymology for xiangwang < *s.[d]aŋʔmaŋʔ  is the Austro-Tai root *s[u][y]aŋ "spirit; god".

 see [].  an imaginary monster which devours the brains of the dead underground. — [] A sprite; an elf. An animal which eats dead men's brains. It fears pine-trees and tigers; hence the former are planted at graves, and stone tigers are also set up.
 [see ] the penumbra.  an imaginary monster of the waters. —  An elf. A sprite. An animal which is said to eat the brains of the dead underground.
 (1) spirits, monsters of the mountain rivers (2) the penumbra —  a kind of monster
 (1) spirits, demons of the wilds (also wr. ); (2) (AC) the penumbra, fringe shadow. —  mountain spirits, demons.
 demons and monsters
 demons and monsters

Classical usages
Wangliang first appears in the Chinese classics from around the 4th-century BCE and was used in a variety of sometimes contradictory meanings. While the dates of some early texts are uncertain, the following examples are roughly arranged chronologically.

Guoyu
The (5th–4th century BCE) Guoyu "Discourses of the States" quotes Confucius using wangliang 魍魎 and wangxiang 罔象 to explain ancient demon names to Ji Huanzi 季桓子 (d. 492 BCE) of Lu.
[Ji Huanzi], a grandee of the state of Lu, caused a well to be dug, when they fetched up something like an earthen pot with a goat in it. He had [Zhong Ni] (Confucius) interrogated about it, in these words: "I dug a well, and got a dog; tell me what this is." On which the Sage answered: "According to what I have learned, it must be a goat; for I have heard that apparitions between trees and rocks are called [Kui 夔] and [wangliang], while those in the water are [long 龍] or dragons, and [wangxiang], and those in the ground are called [fenyang 羵羊]. (魯語下) 
This mushi 木石 literally means "trees and rocks" and figuratively "inanimate beings; emotionlessness; indifference". Wei Zhao's commentary says the wangxiang supposedly eats humans and is also called the muzhong 木腫 "tree/wood swelling". The Shiji version of this story, which is set in 507 BCE during the reign of Duke Ding of Jin, writes wangliang 罔閬 with 閬 "dry moat" and fenyang as 墳羊 "grave sheep" with 墳 "grave; tomb" instead of 羵羊 "spirit sheep" (cf. Huannanzi).

Zuozhuan
The (late 4th century BCE) Zuozhuan commentary to the (c. 6th–5th centuries BCE) Chunqiu history has an early, if not earliest, usage of chimeiwangliang 螭魅罔兩. This context describes how Yu the Great, legendary founder of the Xia Dynasty, ordered that the Nine Tripod Cauldrons be cast in order to acquaint people with all the dangerous demons and monsters found in China's Nine Provinces.
In the past when the Xia dynasty still possessed virtue, the distant lands presented images of their strange creatures [shenjian 神姦 "spirit rape"] and the heads of the nine provinces contributed bronze so that vessels were cast which illustrated these creatures. Every kind of strange creature was completely depicted in order that the common people would know the gods and the demons. Thus, when people went to the rivers, lakes, mountains, and forests, they did not encounter these adverse beings nor did the Chimei-Hobgoblins in the hills and the Wangliang-Goblins in the waters accost them. As a result, harmony was maintained between those above and those dwelling on Earth below while everywhere, the people received the protection of Heaven.

Chuci
The "Seven Remonstrances" section (6th remonstrance, 《哀命》) of the c. 3rd–2nd century BCE Chuci (with some later additions) poetically uses wangliang 罔兩 to mean "feeling absentminded and baseless", according to Wang Yi's commentary. The context describes a river drowning suicide.
My fainting soul shrank back, oppressed; And as I lay, mouth full of water, deep below the surface, The light of the sun seemed dim and very far above me. Mourning for its body, dissolved now by decay; My unhoused spirit drifted, disconsolate [罔兩].

Zhuangzi
The (c. 3rd–2nd centuries BCE) Daoist Zhuangzi uses wangliang 罔兩 twice for naming the allegorical character Penumbra, wangxiang 罔象 meaning "a water ghost", and xiangwang 象罔 for the character Amorphous.

Two Zhuangzi chapters tell similar versions of a dialogue between Wangliang 罔兩 Penumbra and Jing 景 "bright; (measure by the) shadow" Shadow (in modern usage, "penumbra" is banying 半影 "half shadow").
Penumbra inquired of Shadow, saying, "One moment you move and the next moment you stand still; one moment you're seated and the next moment you get up. Why are you so lacking in constancy?" 
Shadow said, "Must I depend on something else to be what I am? If so, must what I depend upon in turn depend upon something else to be what it is? Must I depend upon the scales of a snake's belly or the forewings of a cicada? How can I tell why I am what I am? How can I tell why I 'm not what I'm not?" (2) 

Wangxiang names a water demon Nonimagoes. When Duke Huan of Qi (r. 685–643 BCE) was upset by seeing a ghost in a marsh, his chancellor Guan Zhong asks a scholar from Qi named Master Leisurely Ramble [皇子告敖] about the different kinds of ghosts.
In pits there are pacers [履]; around stoves there are tufties [髻]. Fulgurlings [雷霆] frequent dust piles inside the door; croakers [倍阿] and twoads [鮭蠪] hop about in low-lying places to the northeast; spillsuns [泆陽] frequent low-lying places to the northwest. In water there are nonimagoes [罔象]; on hills there are scrabblers [峷]; on mountains there are unipedes [夔]; in the wilds there are will-o'-the-wisps [彷徨]; and in marshes there are bendcrooks [委蛇]. (19) 

Xiangwang is the name of an allegorical character who discovers the xuanzhu 玄珠 "dark/mysterious pearl; Daoist truth" lost by the legendary Yellow Emperor.
The Yellow Emperor was wandering north of Redwater when he ascended the heights of K'unlun and gazed toward the south. As he was returning home, he lost his pearl of mystery. Knowledge [知] was sent to search for the pearl, but he couldn't find it. Spidersight [離朱] was sent to search for the pearl, but he couldn't find it. Trenchancy [喫詬] was sent to search for the pearl, but he couldn't find it, whereupon Amorphous [象罔] was sent and he found it. "Extraordinary!" said the Yellow Emperor. "In the end, it was Amorphous who was able to find it." (12) 
This allegory about the Yellow Emperor is part of the "knowledge story cycle" through which Zhuangzi illustrates the Daoist anti-epistemology of not knowing.

Zhouli
The (1st century BCE – 2nd century CE) Zhouli Rites of the Zhou Dynasty recorded that at a royal funeral, the Fangxiangshi 方相氏 exorcist would leap into the grave and drive away any corpse-eating fangliang 方良, which Zheng Xuan's commentary identifies as the wangxiang.
It is incumbent on the Rescuer of the Country to cover himself with a bear's skin, to mask himself with four eyes of yellow metal, to put on a black coat and a red skirt, and thus, lance in hand and brandishing a shield, to perform, at the head of a hundred followers, a purification in every season of the year, which means the finding out of (haunted) dwellings and driving away contagious diseases. At royal funerals he walks ahead of the coffin and, arriving at the grave, he leaps into the pit to beat the four corners with his lance, in order to drive away the fang-liang spectres.

Li Shizhen's (1578) Bencao Gangmu "Compendium of Materia Medica" quotes this under the Wangliang entry. "Fangliang mentioned here is actually Wangliang. Wangliang loved to eat the livers of the dead, so people had to drive it away from tombs. It was afraid of tigers and arborvitae trees. That is why people placed stone tigers and plant arborvitae trees in graveyards." translates wangliang as "a sprite, an elf, the four eyed naiad".

Huainanzi
The (139 BCE) Huainanzi uses wangliang 魍魎 meaning "mindless; zombielike" and wangxiang 罔象 meaning "a water monster". The former occurs in a description of people's mentality during the mythological golden age of Fuxi and Nüwa. 
Their motions were calm and unhurried; their gaze was tranquil and uncurious. In their ignorance, they all got what they needed to know. Aimlessly drifting, they did not know what they were looking for; zombielike, they did not know where they were going.
Major explains that wangliang was "a kind of corpse monster, said to feed on the brains of the buried dead." The latter occurs in context with Fenyang "a sheep-like earth deity" (cf. Guoyu above) and two mythical birds.
 [When] water gives birth to waterbugs or clams, or mountains give birth to gold and jade, people do not find it strange. ... But when mountains give off Xiaoyang [梟陽], water gives birth to Wangxiang, wood gives birth to Bifang [畢方], and wells give birth to Fenyang [墳羊], people find it strange.

Lunheng
Wang Chong's (80 CE) Lunheng quotes the (c. 2nd–1st century BCE) Liji (but not found in received text) that one of mythological emperor Zhuanxu's sons became a wangliang 魍魎. 
[Zhuanxu] had three sons living who, when they died, became the ghosts of epidemics. One living in the water of the [Yangzi], became the Ghost of Fever, the second in the [Luo] was a Water Spirit, the third, dwelling in the corners of palaces and houses, and in damp storerooms, would frighten children. 
Wolfram Eberhard notes this Luo River 洛水 (cf. modern Luo rivers, in Henan and in Shaanxi) was supposedly in Yunnan, and associates wangliang with the mythological yu 魊 "a three-legged tortoise that causes malaria".

Shuowen jiezi
Xu Shen's (121 CE) Shuowen jiezi defines wangliang 蛧蜽: "It is a spectral creature of mountains and rivers. The King of Huainan says, "The appearance of the wangliang is like that of a three-year-old child, with a red-black color, red eyes, long ears, and beautiful hair." The received Huannanzi text does not contain this royal quote.

Gan Bao's (c. 350 CE) Soushenji "Records of Searching for Spirits" similarly quotes the Xia dingji 夏鼎記, "a [wangxiang] looks like a child of three years, has red eyes, a black color, big ears, and long arms with red claws. Even when fettered with ropes it can find its [human] food."

Baopuzi
Ge Hong's (c. 320) Baopuzi mentions wangliang 魍魎 twice. One context lists the demon among the dangers facing stupid people who walk in mountain valleys.
Or they may be devoured by a tiger or a wolf; slain by a wang-liang demon (in the form of a brown child with red eyes, long ears, and a fine head of hair); or become hungry and remain without a method for dispensing with starchy foods; or become cold and lack a method for warming themselves. (6) 
This translation adds a summarized Shuowen jiezi description. In the other context, Ge Hong quotes oral directions from his master Zheng Yin 鄭隱 (c. 215-c. 302) about preserving zhenyi 真一 "Truth-Unity".
Unity is not hard to know; persistence is the difficulty. Guard it without loss, and you will never know exhaustion. On land, It routs evil animals; on water, dispels crocodiles and dragons. No fear of demons, nor of poisonous insects. Ghost will not dare approach, nor blades strike. (18)

Shuyiji
The Shuyiji 述異記 "Records of Strange Things", compiled by Ren Fang 任昉 (460–508), has a story about finding a fangxiang 方相 "demon that eats brains of the dead", also called fushu 弗述 "not state" or ao 媪 "old woman". The Bencao gangmu quotes the story and records medicinally using the brain of the brain-eating Fangxiang.
The book Shuyi Ji: In the Qin Dynasty (221–206 BC) once an animal was caught by a hunter in Chencang [陳倉]. It looked like a cross between a pig and a sheep. The hunter did not know what it was. At this time two young boys appeared. When asked, the boys said that it was called Fushu or Ao. It ate the brains of the dead in tombs. When a twig of arborvitae was inserted into its head, it would die. Although such things are not related to medicine, they concern the dead. So they are also recorded here for reference. Such an animal is called Fangxiang. If it has four eyes it is called Qi. Such things are all devils. In ancient times people made statues of human beings to represent such ghosts. It was recorded that Mr. Fei Zhangfang [費長房] once made medicinal pills of Li E [李娥] that contained the brain of Fangxiang as an ingredient. This prescription has been lost.

References
 
  Digitalized edition 2007 Chicoutimi Canda - Paris by Pierre Palpant.
 
 
 

Footnotes

Yaoguai